The Aimol people are an ethnic group living mainly in Manipur and in parts of Mizoram, Tripura,Nagaland and Assam in India. They speak Aimol language which is a Kuki-Chin language. Aimol people are one of the Chin-Kuki-Mizo people.

They practice slash-and-burn agriculture and are primarily Christian. Aimol identity is contentious as they are influenced by Kuki-Chin-Mizo groups. Their language is classified as Kuki-Chin-Mizo languages.

References

Sources 
 http://www.ethnologue.com/show_language.asp?code=aim

Languages of India
Ethnic groups in India
Scheduled Tribes of Manipur